The Miss Belgian Beauty contest is the second-largest beauty pageant in Belgium. It was first held in 1991 and is owned by Ignace Crombé.

List of winners

Per province

See also 

 Miss Belgium

References

External links 
 

Belgian awards
Beauty pageants in Belgium
Recurring events established in 1991
1991 establishments in Belgium